Initiate may refer to:

The Initiate, a 1920 series of three occult books by Cyril Scott
"The Initiate", a short story set in the Divergent trilogy by Veronica Roth collected in Four: A Divergent Collection
The Initiate, a novel in The Time Master Trilogy by Louise Cooper, 1985
The Initiate, a drama by Alexandra Wood, 2014
Initiate (Nels Cline Singers album), 2010
Initiate (Mervyn Spence album), 1995

See also
 Initiation (disambiguation)
 Initiator (disambiguation)
 Neophyte (disambiguation)
 Novice (disambiguation)